{{Infobox writer 
| name = Robert A. Burton
| image = 
| imagesize = 
| caption =
| pseudonym    =
| birth_name =
| birth_date = 
| birth_place   = 
| death_date    = 
| death_place   = 
| occupation   = 
| nationality  = American
| period       = 
| genre        = 
| subject      = 
| movement     = 
| notableworks = Doc-In-A-Box (1991)
Final Therapy (1994) Cellmates (1997)On Being Certain (2008)A Skeptic's Guide to the Mind (2013)
| spouse       = 
| partner      = 
| children     = 
| relatives    = 
| influences   = 
| influenced   = 
| awards       = 
| signature    = 
| website = 
}}
Robert A. Burton is an American physician, novelist, nonfiction author and columnist.   His books include three critically acclaimed novels, as well as the nonfiction books On Being Certain: Believing You Are Right Even When You're Not and A Skeptic's Guide to the Mind: What Neuroscience Can and Cannot Tell Us About Ourselves. His essays have appeared in The New York Times, Salon, Aeon, and Nautilus, among other others. His medical career includes being the chief of the Division of Neurology at Mt. Zion UCSF, and Associate Chief of the Department of Neurosciences.

Burton graduated from Yale University and the University of California, San Francisco medical school, where he also completed his neurology residency. He is a resident of the San Francisco Bay Area.

Bibliography

Non-fiction

NovelsDoc-In-A-Box (1991)	Final Therapy (1994)	Cellmates (1997)

 References

External links
 
"Psychology voting: my candidate, myself" in Salon.com
  "The Certainty Bias: A Potentially Dangerous Mental Flaw. A neurologist explains why you shouldn't believe in political candidates that sound too sure of themselves". Interview with Burton in Scientific American''

American neurologists
20th-century American novelists
Living people
Writers from California
Yale University alumni
University of California, San Francisco alumni
Place of birth missing (living people)
Year of birth missing (living people)
American male novelists
American male essayists
20th-century American essayists
20th-century American male writers